The Valparaiso Popcorn Festival began in 1979 as a way to salute Valparaiso, Indiana-native Orville Redenbacher and popcorn.

Scheduled annually on the first Saturday after Labor Day, the Valparaiso Popcorn Festival is an all day event held in the downtown area of Valparaiso.

Included in the festivities are a 5-mile run (the Popcorn Panic), a block-long kiddie run (the Lit'l Kernel Puff), 5-K walk, live entertainment, hundreds of food and craft vendors and the nation's 2nd oldest Popcorn Parade. Parade designers are encouraged to use  popcorn in their float designs.  Early Festivals even offered free popcorn to every attendee.

A popcorn festival is also held in Brazil, Indiana, which was the birthplace of Orville Redenbacher.

There was no festival in 2020.

References

External links
 Official Popcorn Festival site 
 A list of a variety of Corn-related events
 The man who started it all

Valparaiso, Indiana
Popcorn
Festivals in Indiana
Tourist attractions in Porter County, Indiana